The big crested mastiff bat (Promops centralis), is a bat species from South and Central America.

Taxonomy
It was described as a new species in 1915 by British zoologist Oldfield Thomas. The holotype was collected by George F. Gaumer, and presented to Thomas by Osbert Salvin.

Description
It can be differentiated from the other species of Promops, the brown mastiff bat, by its longer forearm.

Biology and ecology
It is a social animal, roosting in small colonies of up to 6 individuals during the day. These roosts consist of the space underneath tree bark, the undersides of palm leaves, or tree hollows. Its search calls have an average duration of 20.6 ms, with a starting frequency of 23.0 kHz, an ending frequency of 25.6 kHz, and a peak frequency of 24.7 kHz.

Range and habitat
The big crested mastiff bat is found in Central and South America. It is found in Argentina, Belize, Bolivia, Brazil, Colombia, Ecuador, El Salvador, French Guiana, Guatemala, Guyana, Honduras, Mexico, Nicaragua, Paraguay, Peru, Suriname, Trinidad and Tobago, and Venezuela.

References

Promops
Mammals of Colombia
Mammals described in 1915
Taxa named by Oldfield Thomas
Bats of Central America
Bats of South America